Exomilus cancellatus is a species of sea snail, a marine gastropod mollusk in the family Raphitomidae.

Description
The length of the shell attains 4.5 mm, its diameter 1.5 mm.

(Original description) The small, fulvous brown shell is narrowly fusiform and turreted. It contains five whorls, sloping angulate above plicate lengthwise. The interstices are broadly striate, giving the whole shell a cancellated appearance. The  aperture is narrowly oval. The outer lip is simple.

Distribution
This marine species is endemic to Australia and occurs off Tasmania

References

 Tate, R. & May, W.L. 1901. A revised census of the marine Mollusca of Tasmania. Proceedings of the Linnean Society of New South Wales 26(3): 344-471 
 Verco, J.C. 1909. Notes on South Australian marine Mollusca with descriptions of new species. Part XII. Transactions of the Royal Society of South Australia 33: 293-342 
 May, W.L. 1921. A Checklist of the Mollusca of Tasmania. Hobart, Tasmania : Government Printer 114 pp.
 Hedley, C. 1922. A revision of the Australian Turridae. Records of the Australian Museum 13(6): 213-359, pls 42-56 
 May, W.L. 1923. An Illustrated Index of Tasmanian Shells: with 47 plates and 1052 species. Hobart : Government Printer 100 pp.

External links
 
 
 Gastropods.com: Exomilus cancellata

cancellatus
Gastropods described in 1883
Gastropods of Australia